Calliostoma irisans is a species of sea snail, a marine gastropod mollusk in the family Calliostomatidae.

Description
The height of the shell attains 11 mm. The whitish shell is strongly iridescent, with mainly a purple hue. The 5¾ whorls are barely concave, with the exception of the body whorl. Only the first and the second whorl are granulated.

Distribution
This marine species occurs off Argentina, the Falkland Islands and the Strait of Magellan

References

External links
 To Biodiversity Heritage Library (2 publications)
 To Encyclopedia of Life
 To World Register of Marine Species

irisans
Gastropods described in 1905